Silver Lake is an unincorporated community located in McHenry County, Illinois, United States. The area is bounded by the villages of Cary to the south and Oakwood Hills to the north.

References

Unincorporated communities in Illinois
Unincorporated communities in McHenry County, Illinois
Chicago metropolitan area